As a surname, Heng may refer to:

 Teochew romanization of the Chinese surname written  (Wáng in Hanyu Pinyin)
 Hokkien romanization of the Chinese surname written  (Xíng in Hanyu Pinyin)

Distribution

Heng is mostly identified as a Teochew-romanized Chinese surname written  (Wáng in Hanyu Pinyin) in Singapore and Malaysia. The Chinese surname was listed 8th on the famous Song Dynasty list of the Hundred Family Surnames and is the most common surname in mainland China. 

However, Heng is an uncommon surname in the United States (ranked 13,044th during the 1990 census and 10,281st during the year 2000 census).

Notable Hengs

王
 Heng Swee Keat, Singaporean politician and Deputy Prime Minister
 Heng Kim Song, Singaporean editorial cartoonist
 Ivan Heng, Singaporean actor
 Heng Chee How, Singaporean politician
 Amanda Heng, Singaporean artist

邢
 Margaret Heng, Singaporean businesswoman
 Nadia Min Dern Heng, Malaysian beauty pageant titleholder and model

References

Chinese-language surnames
Multiple Chinese surnames

Surnames of Cambodian origin
Khmer-language surnames